James Hemphill Brown (born 1942) is an American biologist and academic.

He is an ecologist, and  a Distinguished Professor of Biology at the University of New Mexico. His work has focused on 3 distinct aspects of ecology: 1) the population and community ecology of rodents and harvester ants in the Chihuahuan Desert, 2) large-scale questions relating to the distribution of body size, abundance and geographic range of animals, leading to the development of the field of macroecology, a term that was coined in a paper Brown co-authored with Brian Maurer of Michigan State University. and 3) the Metabolic Theory of Ecology.  In 2005 he was awarded the Robert H. MacArthur Award by the Ecological Society of America for his work, including his work toward a metabolic theory of ecology. Between 1969 and 2011 he was awarded over $18.4 million in grants for his research.

Education and honors

Education
Brown received a bachelors with honors in 1963 before obtaining his PhD in 1967:
Bachelor of Arts, Zoology, 1963, Cornell University
PhD, Zoology, 1967, University of Michigan

Honors
Honors James Brown has received include:
American Association for the Advancement of Science, Fellow, 1988
C. Hart Merriam Award (American Society of Mammalogists) 1989
Fellow of the American Academy of Arts and Sciences, 1995
Eugene P. Odum Award for Education (Ecological Society of America), 2001
Marsh Ward for Career Achievement, (British Ecological Society), 2002
Robert H. MacArthur Award (Ecological Society of America), 2005
Member of the National Academy of Sciences, 2005

Portal
In 1977 Brown, in collaboration with Diane Davidson and James Reichman, started a research project in the Chihuahuan Desert near Portal, Arizona to study competition between rodents and ants and their influence on the annual plant community.

Books

See also
Metabolic theory of ecology

References

External links
"New York Times" article about Dr. Brown's work on biological scaling
 Home Page

Cornell University alumni
University of Michigan alumni
Living people
American ecologists
1942 births
Members of the United States National Academy of Sciences
Fellows of the Ecological Society of America
University of New Mexico faculty